The Revealer: A Review of Religion and Media is an online magazine published by the Center for Religion and Media at New York University. The Revealer publishes ten issues per year and features articles that explore religion and its many roles in society, politics, the media, and in people's lives.

History 
NYU Journalism professor Jay Rosen developed the idea for the Revealer as a project for NYU's Center for Religion and Media, one of ten Centers of Excellence initially funded by The Pew Charitable Trusts and that Angela Zito and Faye Ginsburg founded in 2003. Jeff Sharlet and Kathryn Joyce created the Revealers website in 2003. Sharlet served as editor of the publication for five years before becoming a bestselling author with his book The Family: The Secret Fundamentalism at the Heart of American Power. In 2010, Ann Neumann assumed the position of editor, a title she kept until 2013. Kali Handelman was editor from 2013 to 2019, and Brett Krutzsch became editor in 2019.

The Revealer features articles from scholars, journalists, and freelance writers that explore how religion shapes, and is shaped by, race, sexuality, gender, politics, history, and culture. The online magazine publishes articles in many forms, including feature essays with original research and on-the-ground reporting, first person narratives, opinion pieces, interviews, photo-essays, and reviews of books, film, and television.

Current Publication 
Since 2013, the Revealer has published ten issues a year, with a new issue coming out every month except January and August. Each issue covers a wide range of topics related to religion, with the exception of yearly "special issues" that focus on a single topic. A special issue in 2022 explored "Trans Lives and Religion," and a special issue in 2020 explored "Religion and Sex Abuse." 

In 2020, the magazine launched the Revealer Podcast. Since then, the Revealer podcast releases eleven episodes a year. In 2021, the Religion News Association named it a finalist for best religion podcast.

In 2021, the Religion News Association awarded the Revealer the award for "Excellence in Magazine Overall Religion Coverage," the highest prize for a print or online religion magazine.

See also
Reveal (disambiguation)

References

External links
 

American religious websites